Nicol Ó Duibhghiolla was Bishop of Kilmacduagh in 1419.

Nicol Ó Duibhghiolla was appointed bishop before October 1419, replacing the late  Diamaid Ó Donnchadha (appointed about July 1418), but never consecrated. The see was instead held from 23 October 1419 by Seaán Ó Connmhaigh.

References

 The Surnames of Ireland, Edward MacLysaght, 1978.
 A New History of Ireland: Volume IX - Maps, Genealogies, Lists, ed. T.W. Moody, F.X. Martin, F.J. Byrne, pp. 322–324.

External links
 http://www.ucc.ie/celt/published/T100005C/
 http://www.irishtimes.com/ancestor/surname/index.cfm?fuseaction=Go.&UserID=

People from County Galway
15th-century Roman Catholic bishops in Ireland